Chicago Catholic is the official newspaper of the Archdiocese of Chicago. The publication was known as Chicago New World prior to a name change in January 2017.

Its mission is to be the key source of information about the church in Chicago. It provides news, analysis and commentary about the church at the world, national and local levels and about issues of concern to the Catholic community.

Contributors
 Cardinal Francis George
 Bishop Robert Barron

References

External links
 Chicago Catholic website

Roman Catholic Archdiocese of Chicago
Catholic newspapers published in the United States
Newspapers published in Chicago